Federalist No. 62 is an essay by James Madison, the sixty-second of The Federalist Papers. It was published on February 27, 1788 under the pseudonym Publius, the name under which all The Federalist papers were published. This is the first of two essays by Madison detailing, and seeking to justify, the organization of the United States Senate. It is titled "The Senate".

Five key considerations are brought up in the introductory paragraph, of which only three and a part of the fourth are discussed in Federalist No. 62. Madison's thoughts on this subject are completed in Federalist No. 63:
 The qualifications of senators (thirty years of age or older/citizen for nine years),
 the appointment of Senators by the state legislatures – later changed to direct popular vote by the 17th amendment in 1913,
 the equality of representation in the Senate, and 
 the number of senators.

Proposed qualifications of a member of the Senate 
A member of the Senate must be thirty years of age and have been an American citizen for nine years while a Member of the House of Representatives is required to be 25 years of age and needs to have been a citizen for only seven. James Madison's reasoning for this is that with age comes more wisdom and a lower chance of being affected by emotion when making decisions. The reason for the longer period of citizenship is to protect the government from any influence that other countries could have, caused by appointing those who have not been in America for long enough to understand the values and interests of the people. These requirements are still the same today.

Method of appointing members of the Senate 
Madison believed the Senate should be a method of connecting state and national government. Therefore, he proposed that senators be voted in by the State legislatures in order to keep the Senate exclusive to a well selected and qualified group of individuals while also effectively linking the two government groups. However, after passage of the  Seventeenth Amendment in 1913, senators of each State are elected through popular vote by the residents of each State.

The equality of representation 
The Senate is meant to regulate the power of the House of Representatives by giving equal power to every state in the Senate. This is accomplished by allowing each State two senators with one vote each, which counteracts the fact that the number of representatives per state is based on the size and population of the state. As Madison says, "the government ought to be founded on a mixture of the principles of proportional and equal representation". Due to this, each state has equal power in the Senate, which in turn protects smaller States from being overpowered by larger States. Representatives are elected with the people's interests in mind, while senators are elected with the States' interests in mind. What this means is that when the House of Representatives votes to pass a law or bill it is then voted for in the Senate which leads to the passing of laws that cater to both the States and the people. This type of two-stage voting system keeps the House of Representatives from passing too many laws or from passing laws that possibly serve the interests of the people themselves.

External links 

 Text of The Federalist No. 62: Congress.gov
 The Federalist No. 62 Text

1788 in American law
62
1788 in the United States
1788 essays